Jamal ol Din (also Romanized as Jamāl ol Dīn) is a village in Alqurat Rural District, in the Central District of Birjand County, South Khorasan Province, Iran. At the 2006 census, its population was 12, in 4 families.

References 

Populated places in Birjand County